Georgia's 283rd Combat Communications Squadron is a unit of the Georgia Air National Guard based at Dobbins Air Reserve Base. The 283rd is responsible for "first-in" rapid deployment and "build-up" of an integrated force with modern communications equipment and multi-skilled personnel.

Mission
The unit provides scalable command and control, intelligence, surveillance and reconnaissance, and information operations capabilities to expeditionary air and space forces for any contingency operation.

The 283rd supports two critical US missile defense missions. The first is the National Capital Region-Integrated Air Defense System, which is responsible for the security of the airspace found around the nation's capital. In accordance with the unit's mission to provide deployable communications and information capabilities, the 283rd provides the complex communications infrastructure for the purpose of training and certifying personnel rotating into the national capital region to man and operate the Integrated Air System.

The second missile defense mission is to provide a tactical communications infrastructure supporting a Deployable Integrated Air Defense System. This deployable version of the NCR-IADS responds to any National Special Security Event requiring a missile defense course of action.

References

External links 
 283rd Combat Communications Squadron Website

Marietta, Georgia
Military in Georgia (U.S. state)